Royal Army Engineers Regiment is a group combat support military units of the Malaysian Army that provides combat engineering and other engineering support to the Malaysian Army.

History 
Rejimen Askar Jurutera DiRaja was founded on 22 April 1953 at Balaclava Lines Kluang Garrison Johor, after the first recruitment of 37 people was made at the Recruitment Training Center in Port Dickson.

On 1 January 1954, 76 Federal Field Squadron was formed at Balaclava Lines Kluang Garrison. This is the first unit for Federation Engineers. In March 1954 Major I.G Wellsted RE began the formation of Federal Field Squadron. On 1 September 1954, 16 SNCO was transferred from the Royal Engineers to 76 Federal Field Squadron and WO II Yusak bin Hj Omar became  the first SSM.

On 15 July 1957, 2 Engineer Squadron was formed with 201 officers and men transferred from 75 Malayan Field Squadron including Lt Asmit bin Mohd Said (400058). 76 Federal Field Squadron, Federation Engineers was redesignated as 1 Engineer Squadron.

On the same day, The Federation Army formed the Engineer Branch at the Riffle Range Road Kuala Lumpur and Lt Colonel RA Blakeway, OBE, was made the first Chief of Engineers.  The branch is now known the Engineer Directorate at the Malaysian Army HQ and 10 Engineer Training Detachment  was formed at Kluang Garrison Johor. The unit is now known the Army Institute of Field Engineering (Institut Kejuruteraan Medan TD).

On 1 March 1962, 40 Port Operations (AW) and 50 Rail Operations (AW) was officially raised. 21 Engineers (AW) and 22 Engineers (AW) are set up in Kajang and Kluang respectively. This unit is the earliest Engineers units (AW).

On 16 Sept 1963, 3 Engineer Squadron was formed at Sangro Camp. 6 officer including Captain Chang Yew Kuan and Lt Kailas Chidambaram and 179 out of total of 205 other ranks transferred from 75 Malayan Field Squadron to 3 Engineer Squadron. 
75 Malayan was disbanded on 15 Sept 1963.

10 Engineer Training Detachment upgraded to Engineer Training Squadron on 1 January 1964, to undertake the training of combat engineers. On 21 Dis 1970, the squadron upgraded to 10 Engineer Training Regiment, and now known as the Army Institute of Field Engineering or Institut Kejuruteraan Medan TD (IKEM).

Rejimen Askar Jurutera was bestowed the title “Royal” on 6 June 1992.

Role and responsibilities 
In wartime, Rejimen Askar Jurutera DiRaja is tasked with ensuring the ease and speed of mobility of friendly units by
 building roads, and other transport infrastructure, including bridges.
 building, repairs and maintenance of airstrips and landing zones
 Assault bridging
 Overcoming riverine obstacles
 Clearing of obstacles, minefields and booby traps
 provide shelter, water supply  and build camps

Rejimen Askar Jurutera Diraja is also tasked to delay the advance of enemy forces by placing hindrances and obstacles
 laying road obstacles, minefields, abatises (defensive obstacle made by laying felled trees on top of each other)
 construction of camouflaged hides, bunkers and tank dugouts.

In times of peace, Rejimen Askar Jurutera DiRaja assisted civilian authorities in handling of key ports and transport nodes, and provide heavy equipment to civil authorities during disasters.

Colonel-in-Chief and Motto 
The present Colonel-in-Chief is Sultan Nazrin Muizzuddin Shah ibni Almarhum Sultan Azlan Muhibbuddin Shah Al-Maghfurlah, the present Sultan of Perak.

The motto of Rejimen Askar Jurutera DiRaja is “BERUSAHA BERFAEDAH”.

The regimental flag has horizontal bars of red, blue and yellow. The blue represents the renowned “Sapper Blue” colour used on Engineer tactical signs.  Yellow represents the Malaysian Monarch and Red represent the sacrifices of the Regiment. 

The Regimental Emblem is a Blue Garter of the Order of the Garter with the regimental title in gold, the Garter, honoring the links to the United Kingdom and the British Army's Royal Engineers, surrounds the shield from the national arms. The Blue Garter, topped by the crown, is surrounded by a gold laurel wreath.

Organisation 
Rejimen Askar Jurutera DiRaja currently has the following units

Regular Army
 3 Field Regiments.
 7 combat Engineer Squadrons
 3 Support Engineer Squadron
 1 Construction Regiment
 1 Parachute Engineer Squadron
 1 Engineer Squadron (Armoured)
 1 Engineer Squadron (Mechanised)
 1 Special Malaysia Disaster Assistance and Rescue Team (SMART) - Putrajaya
 1 Engineer Squadron (CBRNe) Chemical Biology Responder Nuclear

Reserves
 1 Field Regiment (Rejimen Askar Wataniah)
 4 Field Squadrons (Rejimen Askar Wataniah)
 1 Field Regiment (Maintenance and Communications) (Rejimen Askar Wataniah)
 4 Expert Handling Regiments (Rejimen Askar Wataniah).
 Port
 Railway
 Water
 Power Plants
 Telecommunication Infrastructure

Institut Kejuruteraan Medan (IKEM)
 (Field Engineering Institute) handles all training requirements of Rejimen Askar Jurutera DiRaja, specifically the training of the combat engineer. Combat engineer training is also made available to Army personnel from other regiments.

Rejimen Pengendalian Pakar (Rejimen Askar Wataniah)
 (Rejimen Askar Wataniah) and the Skuadron Jurutera Medan Pakar (Rejimen Askar Wataniah) are volunteer reserve regiments and squadrons of the Rejimen Askar Wataniah. These units specialise in the handling of ports, waterworks,  railway, power plant/electric supply or telecommunications.

Jabatanarah Perumahan dan Pembinaan
 oversees the building of housing for Armed Forces Personnel as well as oversee the building of Army installations.

Bahagian Geospatial Pertahanan (Defence Geospatial Division)
 is based at the Malaysian Survey and Mapping Department with the primary role of meeting the mapping requirements of the Malaysian Army. The Defence Geospatial Division is headed by a Brigedier General.

References

External links
  (Archived version)

Malaysia Army corps and regiments
Military engineer corps
Military units and formations established in 1953